Parson and Scoville Building, also known as the Pasco Building, is a historic commercial building located in downtown Evansville, Indiana. It was built in 1908, and is a six-story, brick building.  The building was originally built to house the warehouse of a wholesale grocery.

It was listed on the National Register of Historic Places in 1982.

References

Commercial buildings on the National Register of Historic Places in Indiana
Commercial buildings completed in 1908
Buildings and structures in Evansville, Indiana
National Register of Historic Places in Evansville, Indiana
1908 establishments in Indiana
Grocery store buildings